Akathaso are Burmese nats (spirits) who inhabit the tops of trees and serve as guardians of the sky.

They are related to Thitpin Saung Nat and Myay Saung Nat,who respectively live on the trunks and roots of the trees. Myay Saund Nats are guardian spirits of the earth while Thitpin Saung Nats are guardian spirits of trees.

Gallery

Notes

References

 

Burmese nats
Sky and weather deities

my:ဘုမ္မစိုး